Parentis may refer to:
Parentis-en-Born
In loco parentis